Gary Haberl (4 July 1965 – 18 November 2019) was an Australian table tennis player. He competed in the men's singles event at the 1988 Summer Olympics, and was a ten-time national champion.

References

External links
 

1965 births
2019 deaths
Australian male table tennis players
Olympic table tennis players of Australia
Table tennis players at the 1988 Summer Olympics
Place of birth missing